Saccharopolyspora indica is a bacterium from the genus of Saccharopolyspora which has been isolated from the rhizosphere of the plant Callistemon citrinus from New Delhi in India.

References

 

Pseudonocardineae
Bacteria described in 2014